Ichangu Narayan is a village and former Village Development Committee that is now part of Nagarjun Municipality in Province No. 3 of central Nepal. At the time of the 2011 Nepal census it had a population of 24,425 and had 6,288 households in it.

References

Populated places in Kathmandu District